Lozotaeniodes brusseauxi is a species of moth of the family Tortricidae. It is found on Corsica.

The wingspan is about 25 mm. Adults are on wing in July.

References

	

Moths described in 1999
Archipini